Cameron Bock (born September 18, 1998) is an American artistic gymnast. He competes as a member of the University of Michigan men's gymnastics team.

He won the gold medal in the men's team all-around event at the 2018 Pan American Gymnastics Championships held in Lima, Peru.

In 2019, he competed at the 2019 Winter Cup, where he placed third on pommel horse. He also represented the United States at the Pan American Games held in Lima, Peru and he won the bronze medal in the men's parallel bars event. He also won the silver medal in the men's artistic team all-around event.

References

External links 
 

Living people
1998 births
Place of birth missing (living people)
American male artistic gymnasts
Gymnasts at the 2019 Pan American Games
Pan American Games silver medalists for the United States
Pan American Games bronze medalists for the United States
Pan American Games medalists in gymnastics
Medalists at the 2019 Pan American Games
Michigan Wolverines men's gymnasts